Free Radio Coventry & Warwickshire  is an Independent Local Radio station based in Birmingham, England, owned and operated by Bauer as part of the Hits Radio network. It broadcasts to Coventry and Warwickshire.

As of December 2022, the station has a weekly audience of 115,000 listeners according to RAJAR.

History

The station began broadcasting as Mercia Sound at 0700 BST on 23 May 1980, with an opening announcement by Programme Director Ian Rufus, followed by breakfast presenter Gordon Astley and a news bulletin read by Mike Henfield.

In 1987, the station moved FM frequencies, along with most ILR stations at the time to 97.0 FM. Shortly after this a new transmitter on 102.9 FM was created to serve South Warwickshire.

In 1989, along with BRMB in Birmingham, the AM frequency was split from the FM transmissions to create a new radio station called Xtra AM which played music from the 1960s and 1970s.

In 1993, the station's owners, Midlands Radio, sold the station to Capital Radio who, shortly afterwards sold it to GWR Group, who re-branded it in-line with their "Today's Best Mix" slogan from 1994 onwards. During this period numerous presenters from other GWR stations joined Mercia, including Craig Strong (Trent FM, Ram FM, Leicester Sound), Tim Gough (Trent FM), Adrian Eyre (Trent FM, Ram FM), Rachael Hopper (Ram FM) and Sean Goldsmith (Trent FM). From 2002 onwards, the slogan was "Playing the best mix of the 80's, 90's and today". In 2007, it reverted to the old slogan of "Today's Best Mix".

On 8 August 2008, it was confirmed that due to competition 'conflict of interests' in the West Midlands (and in other areas), Mercia would be sold by Global Radio, along with other West Midlands owned GCap/Global stations BRMB, Wyvern FM, Heart 106 and Beacon Radio. In July 2009, the station was sold officially to a company, backed by Lloyds Development Capital and Phil Riley, called Orion Media.

At this time, seven hours of local programming were broadcast each weekday with four hours on weekend afternoons and a regional daytime programme on weekdays.

On 8 July 2011, Orion Media announced plans to close Mercia's studios at Hertford Place in Coventry and co-locate the station to the company's headquarters in Birmingham – the move took place two months later and the Hertford Place studios were transferred to community radio station Radio Plus.

On 9 January 2012, Orion Media announced that Mercia would be rebranded as a Free Radio Coventry & Warwickshire from April 2012, along with its sister West Midlands stations Beacon, BRMB and Wyvern. The Mercia brand was phased out on Wednesday 21 March 2012 in preparation for the rebrand, which took place at 7pm on Monday 26 March 2012.

On 6 May 2016, the station's owners, Orion, announced they had been brought by Bauer for an undisclosed fee, reportedly between £40 and £50 million.

In May 2019, following OFCOM's decision to relax local content obligations from commercial radio, Bauer announced Free Radio's Coventry & Warwickshire breakfast show would be shared with the sister station in Herefordshire and Worcestershire from 8 July 2019, presented by John Dalziel and Roisin McCourt. The localised weekday drivetime shows were initially replaced by a single regional show, presented by Andy Goulding.

Regional weekend afternoon shows were axed in favour of additional network programming. As of 2 September 2019, further networked output replaced the weekday drivetime show.

On 23 November 2021, Bauer announced the station's Hits at Breakfast show, presented by John Dalziel and Roisin McCourt, would broadcast across all four Free Radio licences.

The move was permitted under OFCOM's local content guidelines. The Coventry and Warwickshire station retains opt-outs for local news, traffic updates and advertising.

Programming
All networked programming originates from Bauer’s Manchester studios.

Regional programming, under the Hits at Breakfast banner, is produced and broadcast from Bauer’s Birmingham studios weekdays from 6-10am, presented by John Dalziel and Roisin McCourt.

News
Bauer's Birmingham newsroom broadcasts local news bulletins for Coventry and Warwickshire hourly from 6am-7pm on weekdays, from 7am-1pm on Saturdays and Sundays. Headlines are broadcast on the half-hour during weekday breakfast and drivetime shows, alongside traffic bulletins.

National bulletins from Sky News Radio are carried overnight with bespoke networked bulletins on weekend afternoons, usually originating from Bauer's Leeds newsroom.

Previous logos

References

External links
 Free

Bauer Radio
Hits Radio
Radio stations in the West Midlands (region)
Coventry
Radio stations in Warwickshire
Radio stations established in 1980